So This Is Marriage is a lost 1924 American silent drama film directed by Hobart Henley. The film was originally released with sequences filmed in the Technicolor 2-color process that depicted the story of David and Bathsheba from the Book of Samuel.

Plot
As described in a review in a film magazine, after their engagement, where he dreams of wealth and power, a big house full of boys, and she of clothes, Peter Marsh (Nagel) marries Beth (Boardman) and their troubles begin. Beth is extravagant and Peter becomes irritated and they have frequent rows. Peter prospers in business yet has a hard time meeting their bills. Rankin (Cody), a connoisseur of women, sees Beth and frames-up an accident to her car so he can come to her assistance. Finally, he invites her to a dance and Peter, who has chided her regarding this acquaintance as he sees how Rankin is endeavoring to win his wife, orders her not to go. She goes anyway and they have a terrible row. Beth leaves and goes to Rankin who, finding that she still loves her husband, tells her the story of the woe that befell King David (Oland) and Bathsheba (Scott) because of their forbidden love. Beth sees the point and goes back to her husband and baby, while Rankin prepares for other conquests.

Cast

Preservation
With no copies or prints of So This Is Marriage located in any film archives, it is a lost film. The last known copy of this film was destroyed in the 1965 MGM vault fire.

See also
List of early color feature films

References

External links

So This Is Marriage? at silentera.com
Stills at silenthollywood.com
So This Is Marriage? at catalog.afi.com

1924 films
1924 drama films
1920s color films
1924 lost films
Silent American drama films
American silent feature films
Films directed by Hobart Henley
Metro-Goldwyn-Mayer films
Lost American films
Silent films in color
Lost drama films
1920s American films